The 1957 Indian general election polls in Tamil Nadu were held for 34 seats in the state. The result was a victory for Indian National Congress winning 24 out of 34 seats. The major opposition for INC, the CPI, managed to only win 2 seats.  This election also saw the entry of Dravida Munnetra Kazhagam in their first national election, who ended up winning 2 seats. Due to the nonrecognition of state parties such as the DMK, they were grouped under independent parties, which won a total of 8 seats.

Voting and results

Results by Alliance

 Independent parties are local state parties (like DMK), that are unrecognised nationally

List of Elected MPs

See also 
Elections in Tamil Nadu

Bibliography 
Volume I, 1957 Indian general election, 2nd Lok Sabha

External links
 Website of Election Commission of India
 CNN-IBN Lok Sabha Election History

1957 elections in India
Indian general elections in Tamil Nadu